Helmut Strumpf (born 20 February 1951) is a German former wrestler. He competed in the men's freestyle 62 kg at the 1976 Summer Olympics.

References

External links
 

1951 births
Living people
German male sport wrestlers
Olympic wrestlers of East Germany
Wrestlers at the 1976 Summer Olympics
People from Börde (district)
Sportspeople from Saxony-Anhalt